Commonwealth Oil Refineries (COR) was an Australian oil company that operated between 1920 and 1952 as a joint venture of the Australian government and the Anglo-Persian Oil Company.

Early history

The partnership was established in 1920 on the initiative of prime minister Billy Hughes.

The board was to consist of seven members, three representing the Commonwealth and four representing the Anglo-Persian Oil Company. The provisional board consisted of: Sir Robert Garran, M. C. Lockyer, and Robert Gibson for the Commonwealth, and F. H. Bathurst, Professor Payne, T. J. Greenway, and W. J. Windeyer for the oil company. Greenway served as chairman for the first year.

In 1922, the company purchased the disused shale oil refinery at Hamilton, that had been operated by British Australian Oil Company, and relocated equipment from there for use in its new refinery in Victoria.

In 1924 it opened Australia's first oil refinery that processed imported crude oil, near Laverton, Victoria, north of the Melbourne - Geelong railway, adjacent to Kororoit Creek Road. The refinery received its first shipment of crude oil on 12 March 1924, with product coming "on-stream" on 17 May 1924. The refinery had an annual processing capacity of 100,000 tons of crude oil. The refinery was shut down on 6 August 1955, eclipsed by much larger refineries being built around the country.

In the 1930s the company was involved in oil search ventures.

BP
In 1952, the Menzies Coalition government sold the Australian government's interest in COR to the Anglo-Iranian Oil Company, which became the British Petroleum Company (BP) in 1954. Former PM Billy Hughes last speech in parliament was an attack on the Menzies Government's decision to sell its share in Commonwealth Oil Refineries, one of the state-owned enterprises his government had established over 30 years earlier. According to H.V. Evatt, his speech "seemed at once to grip the attention of all honourable members present ... nobody left the House, and nobody seemed to dare to move".

In 1955 it developed a refinery at Kwinana, Western Australia

BP/COR
Between 1952 and 1959, BP Australia branded its standard-grade petrol as COR, but then dropped the name.

See also

Ampol
Golden Fleece Company
Neptune Oil Company

References

Works cited

External links

Joint ventures
Anglo-Persian Oil Company
Defunct oil and gas companies of Australia
Former Commonwealth Government-owned companies of Australia